Otakar "Otto" Hemele (22 January 1926 in Prague – 3 June 2001 in Prague) was a Czech football player, who was a devoted player of Slavia Prague. He played for the Czechoslovakia national team (10 matches/4 goals) and was a participant at the 1954 FIFA World Cup, where he played two matches.

Notes

References 
  ČMFS entry

1926 births
2001 deaths
Czech footballers
Czechoslovak footballers
1954 FIFA World Cup players
Czechoslovakia international footballers
Dukla Prague footballers
SK Slavia Prague players
Footballers from Prague
Association football forwards